Unmasked is a 1929 American mystery film directed by Edgar Lewis and starring Robert Warwick, Milton Krims and  Sam Ash. It was produced by the Poverty Row studio Artclass Pictures controlled by the Weiss Brothers, utilizing the phonofilm sound system. It features the fictional detective Craig Kennedy created by Arthur B. Reeve.

Cast
 Robert Warwick as Craig Kennedy
 Milton Krims as 	Prince Hamid
 Sam Ash as Billy Mathews
 Charles Slattery as Inspector Collins
 Sue Conroy as Mary Wayne 
 Lyons Wickland as Larry Jamieson
 William Corbett as Franklin Ward
 Royal Byron as Cafferty 
 Marie Burke as Mrs. Brookfield
 Kate Roemer as 	Madam Ramon
 Helen Mitchel as 	Mrs. Ward
 Waldo Edwards as Gordon Hayes
 Clyde Dilson as Imposter

References

Bibliography
 Pitts, Michael R. Poverty Row Studios, 1929–1940: An Illustrated History of 55 Independent Film Companies, with a Filmography for Each. McFarland & Company, 2005.

External links

1929 films
1929 mystery films
American black-and-white films
American mystery films
1920s English-language films
Films directed by Edgar Lewis
1920s American films